Yevhen Pronenko (born 4 November 1984) is a Ukrainian football defender.

Club history
Pronenko began his football career in SILKO Verkhnodniprovsk in Verkhnodniprovsk. He signed with FC Kremin Kremenchuk during 2009 winter transfer window.

Career statistics

References

External links
  Profile – Official Kremin site
  FC Kremin Kremenchuk Squad on the PFL website
  Profile on the FFU website

1984 births
Living people
FC Elektrometalurh-NZF Nikopol players
FC Dnipro-75 Dnipropetrovsk players
FC Kremin Kremenchuk players
Ukrainian footballers
Association football defenders
People from Kamianske
Sportspeople from Dnipropetrovsk Oblast